Borivske where  means coniferous forest(s). It may refer to the following places in Ukraine:

Borivske, Kharkiv Oblast
Borivske, Luhansk Oblast
Borivske, Poltava Oblast
Borivske, Vinnytsia Oblast